Beatrix "the Bride" Kiddo (codename: Black Mamba) is a fictional character and the protagonist of the two-part film Kill Bill directed by Quentin Tarantino. She is portrayed by Uma Thurman. Kiddo was ranked by Empire magazine as 23rd of "The 100 Greatest Movie Characters" of all time, and Entertainment Weekly named her as one of "The 100 Greatest Characters of the Last 20 Years".

Creation 
According to Uma Thurman, she and Tarantino created the character collaboratively during the filming of their 1994 film Pulp Fiction, with Thurman providing the character's first name and Tarantino her last name. After the release of Kill Bill: Volume 2, Tarantino commented that he "love[s] the Bride" and that he "killed [him]self to put her in a good place" for the ending.

Most of the Bride's attributes come from Tarantino's development of Shosanna Dreyfus for his 2009 film Inglourious Basterds which he started to work on before Kill Bill. Originally Dreyfus was a badass assassin who had a list of Nazis she would cross off as she killed. Tarantino later switched the character over to the Bride and redeveloped Dreyfus.

Tarantino has said he saved most of the Bride's nuanced character development for the second half:  "As far as the first half is concerned, I didn't want to make her sympathetic. I wanted to make her scary." Thurman cited Clint Eastwood's performance as Blondie in the 1966 film, The Good, the Bad and the Ugly, as a central inspiration for her performance because, in her words, Eastwood "says almost nothing but somehow manages to portray a whole character."

Kill Bill
Kiddo is a member of the Deadly Viper Assassination Squad, an elite, shadowy group of assassins. She is trained by martial arts master Pai Mei and becomes the right hand of Bill, her boss and lover, provoking the envy of fellow Viper Elle Driver.

When she discovers she is pregnant with Bill's child, Kiddo abandons the Deadly Vipers so her baby can have a better life and becomes engaged. Bill, assuming her fiancé is the father, orders them assassinated at the chapel and shoots her in the head.

Kiddo  survives and falls into a coma. Bill aborts an order to have her assassinated in the hospital, considering it dishonorable when she cannot defend herself. Kiddo awakens from the coma and is horrified to find that she is no longer pregnant. She tracks down the Deadly Vipers, including O-Ren Ishii, now the leader of the Tokyo yakuza, and exacts revenge under the assumption that her child died during her coma.

In Mexico, Kiddo tracks Bill to a hotel and discovers that their daughter B.B. is still alive, now four years old. Kiddo kills Bill using the five-point-palm exploding heart technique, taught to her by Pai Mai. Beatrix leaves with B.B. to start a new life.

Cultural impact

Beatrix Kiddo was well received by audiences. In 2015, Empire Magazine ranked the character 23rd out of 100 in its list of The 100 Greatest Movie Characters of All Time. Entertainment Weekly also named the Bride as 99th on its 2010 list of the 100 Greatest Characters of the Last 20 Years. In 2013, researchers named a new species of parasitic wasp, Cystomastacoides kiddo, after the character, stating that the naming was inspired by "the deadly biology [of the wasp] to the host." Kobe Bryant adopted the character's codename "Black Mamba" as his own nickname in his career.

Although her character was named "The Blonde Fox" (a different character than Mia Wallace's on Fox Force Five), actress Evan Rachel Wood played a character inspired by both Thurman's character Mia Wallace from Pulp Fiction and the Bride for a 2019 stage musical based on Tarantino's films and featuring music from his films, titled Fox Force Five and the Tyranny of Evil Men (Fox Force Five is a fictional TV series mentioned in Pulp Fiction). The character was later portrayed by Lindsey Gort in a 2021 version of the play.

In 2015, the rock band Fall Out Boy released the single "Uma Thurman", influenced by Mia Wallace, the Bride and Dick Dale's "Misirlou" which was featured in Pulp Fiction.

See also
List of female action heroes

References

Ansatsuken
Female characters in film
Fictional female martial artists
Fictional female assassins
Fictional Hung Ga practitioners
Fictional mass murderers
Fictional kenjutsuka
Fictional sole survivors
Fictional vigilantes
Fictional women soldiers and warriors
Fictional swordfighters in films
Fictional female swordfighters
Film characters introduced in 2003
Kill Bill characters
Fictional victims of sexual assault